Blandouet is a former commune in the Mayenne department in northwestern France. On 1 January 2017, it was merged into the new commune Blandouet-Saint Jean.

Population

See also
Communes of Mayenne

References

Former communes of Mayenne